John Wroth (died 1396), of Enfield, Middlesex and Downton, Wiltshire, was an English politician.

He was a Member (MP) of the Parliament of England for Middlesex in October 1382 and 
April 1384 and for Wiltshire in November 1390.

References

Year of birth missing
1396 deaths
English MPs October 1382
People from Wiltshire
People from Enfield, London
Members of the Parliament of England for Middlesex
English MPs April 1384
English MPs November 1390